Project 865 Piranha is a type of Russian (formerly Soviet) midget submarine. The NATO reporting name for the class  is Losos, which means "salmon" in the Russian language.

The Losos class was designed for special operations and engaging surface ships located offshore, and is thus very durable and almost completely silent.

The hull is made of a titanium alloy, which helps with signature management because it is not magnetic. The non-magnetic alloy would greatly reduce the effectiveness of enemy magnetic anomaly detectors or magnetic limpet mines against this type of vessel.

Only two Losos-class submarines were built: MS-520 and MS-521. Original planning called for a total of 12 Project 865 Piranha submarines to be constructed; this was eventually reduced to six, then just the two. Launched in 1986 and 1990, respectively, they are in reserve but are expected to soon be discarded.

References

External links
Federation of American Scientists: Project 865 Piranya Losos Class
cutaway of internal layout

Russian and Soviet navy submarine classes
1986 ships
Auxiliary ships of the Soviet Navy
Midget submarines
Ships built at Admiralty Shipyard